The Sect may refer to:
 The Devil's Daughter, a 1991 Italian horror film also known as The Sect
 The Sect, a fictional group in Kerberos Saga media

See also
 Sect (disambiguation)